The Inner Glow is a 2020 Venezuelan drama film directed by Andrés Eduardo Rodríguez. It was selected as the Venezuelan entry for the Best International Feature Film at the 94th Academy Awards.

Plot
A single mother working as a janitor is diagnosed with a brain tumor and fears for the future of her six-year-old daughter.

See also
 List of submissions to the 94th Academy Awards for Best International Feature Film
 List of Venezuelan submissions for the Academy Award for Best International Feature Film

References

External links
 

2020 films
2020 drama films
Venezuelan drama films
2020s Spanish-language films